Erewash Borough Council elections are held every four years. Erewash Borough Council is the local authority for the non-metropolitan district of Erewash in Derbyshire, England. Since the last boundary changes in 2015, 47 councillors are elected from 19 wards.

Political control
The first election to the council was held in 1973, initially operating as a shadow authority before coming into its powers on 1 April 1974. Since 1973 political control of the council has been held by the following parties:

Leadership
The leaders of the council since 2003 have been:

Council elections
1973 Erewash District Council election
1976 Erewash Borough Council election
1979 Erewash Borough Council election (New ward boundaries)
1983 Erewash Borough Council election
1987 Erewash Borough Council election (Borough boundary changes took place but the number of seats remained the same)
1991 Erewash Borough Council election
1995 Erewash Borough Council election (Borough boundary changes took place but the number of seats remained the same)
1999 Erewash Borough Council election
2003 Erewash Borough Council election (New ward boundaries reduced the number of seats by 1)
2007 Erewash Borough Council election
2011 Erewash Borough Council election
2015 Erewash Borough Council election (New ward boundaries)
2019 Erewash Borough Council election

By-election results

1995-1999

1999-2003

2003-2007

2007-2011

2019-2023

References

 By-election results

External links
Erewash Council

 
Council elections in Derbyshire
Erewash